The 2002 Cincinnati Reds season was the 133rd season for the franchise in Major League Baseball. It consisted of the Reds finishing with a 78-84 record to finish in third place in the National League Central, 19 games behind the St. Louis Cardinals. The Reds were managed by Bob Boone. The 2002 Reds season was their final one in Cinergy Field.

Offseason
 January 7, 2002: José Rijo was signed as a free agent by the Reds.

Regular season

Season standings

National League Central

Record vs. opponents

Notable transactions
 June 7, 2002: Ben Broussard was traded by the Reds to the Cleveland Indians for Russell Branyan.

Roster

Game log

|-style="background:#cfc"
|1 || April 1 || Cubs || 5–4 || Graves || Fassero || — || 41,913 || 1–0 ||  || W1
|-style="background:#fbb"	
|2 || April 3 || Cubs || 3–10 || Wood || Dessens || — || 19,745 || 1–1 ||  || L1
|-style="background:#cfc"	
|3 || April 4 || Cubs || 3–1 || Acevedo || Cruz || Graves || 16,448 || 2–1 || || W1
|-style="background:#fbb"
|4 || April 5 || Expos || 7–8 || Yoshii || Haynes || Lloyd || 17,123 || 2–2 || || L1
|-style="background:#fbb"
|5 || April 6 || Expos || 2–5 || Ohka || Pineda || Lloyd || 18,176 || 2–3 || || L2
|-style="background:#cfc"
|6 || April 7 || Expos || 6–5 || Sullivan || Lloyd || — || 17,549	|| 3–3 || || W1
|-style="background:#fbb"
|7 || April 8 || at Pirates || 0–1 || Villone || Dessens || Williams || 36,402 || 3–4 || || L1
|-style="background:#cfc"
|8 || April 10 || at Pirates || 8–5 || Acevedo || Wells || Graves || 36,048 || 4–4 || || W1
|-style="background:#cfc"
|9 || April 11 || at Pirates || 3–2 || Haynes || Anderson || Graves || 12,795 || 5–4 || || W2
|-style="background:#cfc"
|10 || April 12 || at Phillies || 8–5 || Brower || Cormier || Graves || 13,366 || 6–4 || || W3
|-style="background:#cfc"
|11 || April 13 || at Phillies || 5–2 || Hamilton || Person || Graves || 15,606 || 7–4 || || W4
|-style="background:#fbb"
|12 || April 14 || at Phillies || 1–3 || Padilla || Dessens || Mesa || 19,195 || 7–5 || || L1
|-style="background:#fbb"
|13 || April 16 || Astros || 3–8 || Mlicki || Acevedo || — || 15,853 || 7–6 || || L2
|-style="background:#fbb"
|14 || April 17 || Astros || 2–7 || Hernández || Haynes || — || 14,527 || 7–7 || || L3	
|-style="background:#cfc"
|15 || April 18	|| Astros || 5–4 || White || Cruz || — || 15,848 || 8–7 || || W1
|-style="background:#fbb"
|16 || April 19 || at Cubs || 2–5 || Clement || Hamilton || Alfonseca || 33,949 || 8–8 || || L1
|-style="background:#cfc"
|17 || April 20 || at Cubs || 6–1 || Dessens || Wood || — || 36,476 || 9–8 || || W1
|-style="background:#cfc"
|18 || April 21 || at Cubs || 5–3 || Rijo || Cruz || Graves || 29,458 || 10–8 || || W2
|-style="background:#cfc"
|19 || April 23 || Rockies || 3–2 || Haynes || Jennings || Graves || 14,518 || 11–8 || || W3
|-style="background:#cfc"
|20 || April 24 || Rockies	|| 4–3 || Williamson || Jiménez || — || 13,004 || 12–8 || || W4
|-style="background:#cfc"
|21 || April 25 || Rockies || 4–3 || Sullivan || White || Graves || 14,416 || 13–8 || || W5
|-style="background:#cfc"
|22 || April 26 || Giants || 4–3 || Sullivan || Rodríguez || Graves || 28,341 || 14–8 || || W6	
|-style="background:#cfc"
|23 || April 27 || Giants || 8–4 || Rijo || Jensen || — || 22,616 || 15–8 || || W7
|-style="background:#fbb"
|24 || April 28 || Giants || 4–5 || Rueter || Haynes || Nen || 23,426 || 15–9 || || L1
|-style="background:#cfc"
|25 || April 30	|| at Dodgers || 3–1 || Reitsma || Brown || Graves || 25, 178 || 16–9 || || W1
|-style =

|-style="background:#cfc"
|26 || May 1 || at Los Angeles Dodgers || 4–0 || Hamilton || Nomo || || 23,346 || 17–9 || || W2	
|-style="background:#fbb"
|27 || May 2 || at Los Angeles Dodgers || 2–3 || Carrara || Pineda || || 27,224 || 17–10 || L1
|-style="background:#fbb"
|28 || May 3 || at San Francisco Giants || 1–6 || Rueter || Rijo || || 39,845 || 17–11 || || L2
|-style="background:#fbb"
|29 || May 4 || at San Francisco Giants || 0–3 || Jensen || Haynes || Nen || 40,959	|| 17–12 || || L3
|-style="background:#fbb"
|30 || May 5 || at San Francisco Giants || 5–6 || Nen || Pineda || || 41,263 || 17–13 || || L4	
|-style="background:#cfc"
|31 || May 6 || Milwaukee Brewers || 8–5 || Brower || Quevedo || Graves || 12,867	||18–13 || || W1
|-style="background:#cfc"
|32||May 7||Milwaukee Brewers||8-2||Dessens||Rusch||16,167
|-style="background:#cfc"	
|33||Wednesday, May 8||2002 Milwaukee Brewers season||14-5||Acevedo||Neugebauer||15,691	
|-style="background:#fbb"
|34||May 10||St. Louis Cardinals season ||2-4||Stechschulte||White||Isringhausen||29,008|| || ||
|-style="background:#cfc"
|35||May 11||St. Louis Cardinals season||8-1||Reitsm||Kile|||| 25,006
|-style="background:#cfc"
|36||May 12||St. Louis Cardinals season||8-10||Stechschulte||Graves||Isringhausen||20,622	
|-style="background:#cfc"
|37|| May 13||@Milwaukee Brewers||5-0||Rijo||Cabrera||14,844	+
|-style="background:#cfc"
|38|| May 14||@Milwaukee Brewers||4-3|Acevedo||Quevedo||Graves||15,546	
|-style="background:#cfc"
|39||May 15||Milwaukee Brewers|7-4||Haynes||Stull||Graves||15,561
|-style="background:#cfc"	
|40|| May 16||Milwaukee Brewers||2-1||White||DeJean||Graves||||18,456
|-style="background:#fbb"
|41||May 17||@St. Louis Cardinals season||1-3||Kile||Sullivan||Isringhausen||36,103 || || ||
|-style="background:#cfc"	-
|42||May 18||St. Louis Cardinals season|| 7-3||Rijo||Morris	||40,483
|-style="background:#fbb"	
|43|| May 19||@	St. Louis Cardinals season1-10||Stephenson||Acevedo	||42,992
|-style="background:#fbb"
|44|| May 20||St. Louis Cardinals season||3-7||Williams||Haynes||35,560
|-style="background:#cfc"	
|45|| May 21||Florida Gators||6-1||Reitsma||Burnett	Graves	||16,841
|-style="background:#cfc"
|46||May 22||Florida Gators||6-2||Dessens||Dempster||20,314	
|-style="background:#fbb"
|47||May 23||Florida Gators||4-8||Tavarez||Rijo||Nunez||23,134	-
|-style="background:#fbb"
|48||May 24||@Atlanta Braves||2-11||Millwood||Hamilton||29,307	
|-style="background:#cfc"
|49||May 25||@	Atlanta Braves||6-4||Marquis||Graves||44,026
|-style="background:#fbb"
|50||May 26||Atlanta Braves||5-7 Maddux||Reitsma||40,142	-
|-style="background:#cfc"
|51||May 28||@	Florida Marlinss||6-5||Graves||Nunez|| 7,386	
|-style="background:#cfc"
|52 ||May 29||@	Florida Marlins||8-2||Hamilton||Beckett||6,836	
|-style="background:#cfc"
|53||May 30||Florida Marlins ||W-4-1||Haynes||Olsen||Graves||6,140	
|-style="background:#fbb"
|54||May 31||Atlanta Braves||0-7||Maddux||Reitsma||38,777	-
|-

|- style="text-align:center;"
| Legend:       = Win       = Loss       = PostponementBold = Reds team member

Player stats

Batting

Starters by position
Note: Pos = Position; G = Games played; AB = At bats; H = Hits; Avg. = Batting average; HR = Home runs; RBI = Runs batted in

Other batters
Note: G = Games played; AB = At bats; H = Hits; Avg. = Batting average; HR = Home runs; RBI = Runs batted in

Pitching

Starting pitchers
Note: G = Games pitched; IP = Innings pitched; W = Wins; L = Losses; ERA = Earned run average; SO = Strikeouts

Other pitchers
Note: G = Games pitched; IP = Innings pitched; W = Wins; L = Losses; ERA = Earned run average; SO = Strikeouts

Relief pitchers
Note: G = Games pitched; W = Wins; L = Losses; SV = Saves; ERA = Earned run average; SO = Strikeouts

Farm system 

LEAGUE CHAMPIONS: Stockton

References

2002 Cincinnati Reds season at Baseball Reference

Cincinnati Reds Season, 2002
Cincinnati Reds seasons
Cinc